Nepeta nepetella, common name lesser cat-mint, is a low-growing species of catnip belonging to the family Lamiaceae. It is native to France, Spain, Italy, Algeria, and Morocco.

Subspecies
 Nepeta nepetella subsp. aragonensis (Lam.) Nyman - Spain, Algeria, Morocco
 Nepeta nepetella subsp. laciniata (Willk.) Aedo - Sierra Nevada of southern Spain
 Nepeta nepetella subsp. murcica (Guirão ex Willk.) Aedo - Morocco, southern Spain
 Nepeta nepetella subsp. nepetella - Pyrenees, western Alps, + Apennines of Spain, France, Italy

Description

Uses
Nepetella, as it is commonly called (other names include nepeta, nepitella) is used in Tuscan cooking, often for mushrooms and artichokes. Due to the difficulty in obtaining nepetella, many recipes have been rewritten to contain oregano and mint.

References

nepetella
Cat attractants
Plants described in 1759
Garden plants
Taxa named by Carl Linnaeus